Laura Tomasi (born 1 July 1999) is an Italian professional racing cyclist, who currently rides for UCI Women's WorldTeam .

Major results

2016
 5th Trofeo Da Moreno–Piccolo Trofeo Alfredo Binda
2017
 8th Trofeo Da Moreno–Piccolo Trofeo Alfredo Binda
2018
 8th Gran Premio Bruno Beghelli Internazionale Donne Elite
 8th Erondegemse Pijl
2019
 1nd trofeo oro in euro montignoso
 2nd Trofee Maarten Wynants
2021
 7th Le Samyn
2022
 10th Le Samyn

References

External links
 

1999 births
Living people
Italian female cyclists
Place of birth missing (living people)
Cyclists from the Province of Treviso